Wan Li Ma Wang is a Chinese rock group formed in 1979, which is known to be one of the oldest rock bands originating in China.
The band was set up by four university students from Beijing, Wan Xing, Li Shichao, Ma Xiaoyi and Wang Xinbo. The group name was a derivative of the combination of the group members' surnames.

The band made their public debut in the winter of 1979, when the four performed at the university joint show. They covered songs of the Beatles, Paul Simon, Rolling Stones and the like, which was a contrast to other students' performances — usually recitations or choruses in English.
The band played mainly covers of other bands, which was a novelty to China during the late 1970s.
Its debut was reported by CRI and the group subsequently held live concerts in other Beijing-based Chinese universities.
It was not long before the band was eventually dissolved, when the four members graduated.

Notes

Bibliography

Further reading

 
 
 

Beijing International Studies University people
Chinese rock music groups
Musical groups from Beijing